St. Paul's Church and Cemetery may refer to:

 St. Paul's Church and Cemetery (Newton, North Carolina), listed on the NRHP in North Carolina
 St. Paul's Church and Cemetery (Paris Hill, New York), listed on the NRHP in New York

See also
St. Paul's Church (disambiguation)